Titus De Voogdt (born July 4, 1979) is a Belgian actor.

Biography 
De Voogdt earned a master's degree in sculpture at the Sint-Lucas School of Architecture in Ghent.

He started his acting career in theater and is mainly known for his performances in various plays. One of the first and more recognizable plays include Bernadetje (Victoria), Mijn Blackie (HETPALEIS & Nieuwpoorttheater), Achter de wereld (BRONKS) and Maria eeuwigdurende bijstand / Marie éternelle consolation (Dastheater & Theater Zuidpool). Under Compagnie Cecilia he played in such noteworthy plays as Trouwfeesten en processen, Altijd Prijs and Poepsimpel.

In cinema he has appeared in Any Way the Wind Blows (directed by Tom Barman), as Steve in Steve + Sky (directed by Felix Van Groeningen) in Ben X (directed by Nic Balthazar) and Small Gods (Dimitri Karakatsanis). In 2012 he was featured in Plan B on FOUR where he had his own section.

In 2014 he appeared, as Vincent Bourg, in the BBC One television series The Missing.

Theater
 Chasse Pattate (2017)
 Poepsimpel (2016)
 De geschiedenis van de wereld aan de hand van banaliteiten (2013)
 Duikvlucht (2012)
 Vorst/Forest (2011)
 Altijd prijs (2008)
 Trouwfeesten en processen enzovoorts (2006)
 Maria eeuwigdurende bijstand/Marie éternelle consolation (2005)
 Achter de wereld (2003)
 Mijn Blackie (1999)
 Bernadetje (1996)
 Achter glas (1994)
 De tuin (1994)

Films 
 Any Way the Wind Blows (2003) - Felix
 Steve + Sky (2004) - Steve
 Ben X (2007) - Bogaert
 Small Gods (2007) - David
 22 mei (2010) - Nico Degeest
 Welp (2014) - leider Chris
 Broer (2016) - Ronnie Ovaere
 King of the Belgians (2016) - Carlos
 The Barefoot Emperor (2019)

Television 
 The Missing (2014 - BBC1) - Vincent Bourg
 De day  (2018 - Play4) - Elias De Sutter
 De twaalf (2019 - één) - Mike
 Mijn slechtste beste vriendin ( 2021 ) - Jacobs

References

Belgian male film actors
Belgian male television actors
1979 births
Living people